The J.J. Nesbitt House, at 233 W. Main St. in Owingsville, Kentucky, was listed on the National Register of Historic Places in 2010.

It was built during 1876-78 and is mainly Italianate in style.

References

Houses on the National Register of Historic Places in Kentucky
Houses completed in 1878
National Register of Historic Places in Bath County, Kentucky
1878 establishments in Kentucky